
Eight ships of the Royal Navy have borne the name HMS Siren, Syren or Sirene, after the Sirens of Greek mythology:

 was a 24-gun post ship of the 1741 Establishment launched in 1745 and sold in 1764.
 was a 28-gun  sixth rate launched in 1773 and wrecked in 1777.
 was a 24-gun  launched in 1779 and wrecked in 1781.
 was a 32-gun  fifth rate launched in 1782, on harbour service from 1805 and broken up in 1822.
 was previously the French , a brig-aviso, launched in 1788 at Bayonne.  and  captured her in 1794. She left Jamaica in late July 1796 and was lost without a trace, probably in August 1796.
HMS Siren was to have been a 32-gun  fifth rate, ordered in 1805 and cancelled in 1806.
HMS Siren was previously . She was captured in 1814 and used as a hospital hulk.  She was on the Navy list until 1815.
 was a 16-gun  brig-sloop, launched in 1841 and broken up by 1868.
HMS Siren was previously , an  launched in 1856.  She was renamed HMS Siren in 1895, and was sold in 1896.
 was a  launched in 1900 and sold in 1920.

Uncommissioned vessels
Syren was an American schooner that a British squadron captured off New York in January 1813 and armed for use as a tender. Disposal unknown. 
Siren was a steam tender built in 1855 for the use of royalty at Bermuda and sold in 1863.
Syren was a training tender, purchased in 1878 and attached to HMS Britannia.  She was sold in 1912.

See also
, a Danish 74-gun fourth-rate captured in 1807. She was converted to harbour service in 1809, sold in 1814 but retained and sold again in 1815.

Footnotes
Notes

Citations

References

Royal Navy ship names